Encounter! is an album led by saxophonist Pepper Adams which was recorded in 1968 and released on the Prestige label.

Reception 

Allmusic awarded the album 4 stars stating "Baritonist Pepper Adams and tenor saxophonist Zoot Sims (who rarely performed together) make a surprisingly compatible team... The setting is more advanced than usual for Sims, who rises to the challenge". The Penguin Guide to Jazz commented that "Jones overdoes the bashing, and the uptempo pieces are a battle, but the horns don't falter at any point".

Track listing 
All compositions by Pepper Adams except where noted.
 "Inanout" – 5:47
 "The Star-Crossed Lovers" (Duke Ellington, Billy Strayhorn) – 3:54
 "Cindy's Tune" – 5:58
 "Serenity" (Joe Henderson) – 6:27
 "Elusive" (Thad Jones) – 7:15
 "I've Just Seen Her" (Lee Adams, Charles Strouse) – 7:17
 "Punjab" (Henderson) – 4:05
 "Verdandi" (Tommy Flanagan) – 3:57

Personnel 
Pepper Adams – baritone saxophone
Zoot Sims – tenor saxophone
Tommy Flanagan – piano
Ron Carter – bass
Elvin Jones – drums

References 

Pepper Adams albums
1969 albums
Prestige Records albums